Abhishek Bhandari (born 1 November 1994) is an Indian cricketer. He made his Twenty20 debut for Madhya Pradesh in the 2018–19 Syed Mushtaq Ali Trophy on 21 February 2019. He made his List A debut on 4 October 2019, for Madhya Pradesh in the 2019–20 Vijay Hazare Trophy.

References

External links
 

1994 births
Living people
Indian cricketers
Madhya Pradesh cricketers
Place of birth missing (living people)